MHL Championship may refer to:
Chempionat Molodëzhnoy khokkeynoy ligi
Pervenstvo Molodëzhnoy khokkeynoy ligi